Ernest Gjoka (born 25 January 1970) is an Albanian professional football coach who is the current manager of Saudi First Division League club Ohod. Ernest is a very well known coach in Albania and all over the Balkan, not only for his trophies and achievements, but also for the modern way choosing to train his teams. The modern style of playing football is what makes Gjoka one the best coaches in Balkan. 
With a good CV, Gjoka's now is creating his name in Saudi Arabia, gaining success as he knows.

Managerial career

Kukësi
One of his most important trophies was won with team of Kukësi. With Gjoka as a team manager, Kukësi made a season without any lost. Gjoka has also win 2 other trophies with Kukësi and qualified in many phases in UCL and UEL. 

Shkëndija 
A big step on Gjoka's carer was being a team menager at Shkendija, one of the best teams in Balkan. He demonstrated his coaching skills there, not only by winning the Macedonian league, but also by qualifying in UCL(uefa champions league) and playing a dream game against Jose Mourinho.

Ohod
On 20 September 2022, Gjoka was appointed as manager of Saudi club Ohod.

References

https://www.slobodenpecat.mk/en/goka-motiviran-shto-ke-se-soocham-protiv-eden-od-najdobrite-treneri-vo-svetot/
https://nistori.com/sport/ernest-gjoka-zgjidhet-trajneri-me-i-mire-ne-maqedonine-e-veriut/

External links
Soccerway profile

1970 births
Living people
Sportspeople from Tirana
Albanian football managers
KF Apolonia Fier managers
FC Kamza managers
FK Tomori Berat managers
Flamurtari Vlorë managers
FK Kukësi managers
KF Vllaznia Shkodër managers
Kategoria Superiore managers
FK Shkëndija managers
Ohod Club managers
Saudi First Division League managers
Expatriate football managers in Saudi Arabia
Albanian expatriate sportspeople in Saudi Arabia